Bartolomeu "Tomeu" Llompart Coll (born 6 October 1944) is a Spanish retired footballer who played as a central defender, and a coach.

Most of his playing days were spent with Elche (13 seasons, 11 of those in La Liga, where he amassed totals of 252 games – a best-ever in the club – and four goals), whereas his manager career was closely associated with Mallorca, in various capacities.

Playing career
Born in Inca, Majorca, Llompart signed for Elche CF in 1964 at the age of 19, after spending one season in Segunda División with local club CD Constancia. He made his La Liga debut on 20 September 1964 in a 0–1 home loss to Sevilla FC, scoring his first goal in the competition roughly one year later, against the same opponent (1–1, same venue).

Already as captain, Llompart, who played 125 consecutive games in the top level with his main club, helped to a presence in 1969 Copa del Generalísimo final, lost against Athletic Bilbao. Against the same rival and also in the Copa del Rey, in 1977, he suffered a tibia injury that all but ended his career, aged nearly 33.

Coaching career
Llompart's coaching career lasted four decades, his first spell being with Elche CF Ilicitano in 1977. In the 1990–91 campaign he first worked with the professionals, being relegated from the second division with Orihuela Deportiva CF even though he led the team to the sixth position, for financial irregularities.

In 1992, Llompart returned to his native Balearic Islands and joined RCD Mallorca's coaching staff, going on to work for the organization during the following 14 years, as a caretaker, B-team coach and assistant to the main squad. Late into 1996–97 he replaced Víctor Muñoz at the helm of the latter, as they finally finished third and promoted to the top flight in the playoffs, against Rayo Vallecano.

In 2010–11, Llompart coached Torrellano Illice CF in Tercera División. The following season he joined former team Ilicitano, promoting from the regional championships at the first attempt.

References

External links

1944 births
Living people
Spanish footballers
Footballers from Mallorca
Association football defenders
La Liga players
Segunda División players
CE Constància players
Elche CF players
Spain youth international footballers
Spain under-23 international footballers
Spanish football managers
La Liga managers
Segunda División managers
Segunda División B managers
Elche CF Ilicitano managers
Alicante CF managers
CD Eldense managers
Orihuela Deportiva CF managers
Elche CF managers
RCD Mallorca B managers
RCD Mallorca managers
People from Inca, Mallorca